Sydney Harold James (7 April 1898 – 12 August 1969) was an  Australian rules footballer who played with Geelong in the Victorian Football League (VFL).

He was the brother of Geelong footballers Frederick William "Fred" James (1884-1948) and Leslie Joseph James (1890–1917).

Notes

External links 

1898 births
1969 deaths
Australian rules footballers from Victoria (Australia)
Geelong Football Club players